Robert Mehlhoff (born February 18, 1947) was a Democratic member of the Montana Legislature. He was elected to House District 26 which represents the Great Falls, Montana area.

References

Living people
1950 births
Democratic Party members of the Montana House of Representatives
Politicians from Great Falls, Montana